The George Mason Patriots women's basketball team represents George Mason University and competes in the Atlantic 10 Conference of NCAA Division I.

History
George Mason began play in 1973, joining Division I in 1982. They were members of the Colonial Athletic Association from 1985–2013. They finished as runner-up in the CAA Tournament in 1988, 1994, and 2004. They joined the Atlantic-10 Conference in 2013. The Patriots (as of the end of the 2018–19 season) have an all-time record of 581–607. They have made three postseason appearances, all in the Women's National Invitation Tournament in 2001, 2004, and 2018, winning their first ever postseason game in the 2018 Women's National Invitation Tournament.

References

External links